Ta'aroa is the supreme creator god in the mythology of the Society Islands of French Polynesia.  While the use of the ʻeta is appropriate given the pronunciation of his name, as is typically the case with Tahitian words it is often omitted in practice. He then created the queen of all nations.

The Myth
In the beginning, there was only Ta'aroa, creator of all, including himself.  He waited alone in his shell, which appeared as an egg spinning in the empty endless void of the time before the sky, before the earth, before the moon, before the sun, before the stars.  He was bored, alone in his shell, and so he cracked it with a shake of his body and slid out of its confines, finding everything somber and silent outside, finding himself alone in the nothingness.

So he broke the shell into pieces and from them formed the rocks and the sand, and the foundation of all the world, Tumu-Nui.  With his backbone he created the mountains; with his tears he filled the oceans, the lakes, the rivers; with his fingernails and toenails he made the scales that cover the fish and the turtles; with his feathers he created the trees and the bushes; with his blood he colored the rainbow.

Ta'aroa then called forth artists who came with their baskets filled with To'i, so that they might sculpt Tane, the  first god.  Then came Ru, Hina, Maui, and hundreds of others.  Tane decorated the sky with stars and hung the sun in the sky to illuminate the day and the moon to illuminate the night.  Ta'aroa decided then to complete his work by creating man.

He divided the world into 7 levels.  On the bottommost level lived man, and he multiplied quickly, which delighted Ta'aroa.  Sharing the space as he did with creatures and plants of all sorts, it was not long before man felt crowded in his space and so decided to expand his domain by opening a hole into the level above his.  Man continued in this fashion, filling one level and then climbing to the next, one level at a time, until all levels were occupied.

And so man filled the earth, but still all belonged to Ta'aroa, who was master of all.

See also
 Io Matua Kore paramount deity in New Zealand Māori mythology
 Tagaloa paramount deity in Samoan mythology
 Tangaroa in Māori mythology.
 Tangaloa in Tongan mythology
 Kanaloa in Hawaiian mythology

References

Tahiti and Society Islands gods
Creator gods
Tahiti and Society Islands mythology